The 2014 Harrow Council election took place on 22 May 2014 to elect members of Harrow Council in England. This was on the same day as other local elections.

Results
Labour won control from a minority Conservative administration. Labour won 34 seats, the Conservatives won 26 seats, the Liberal Democrats won 1 seat and Independents won 2 seats.

Council composition
The council composition, as of December 2017, was 32 Labour councillors, 27 Conservatives, 3 independents and 1 Liberal Democrat.

An April 2017 by-election in the Kenton East ward saw the Conservatives gain a seat from Labour, with a 15% increase in the Conservative vote.

On 31 July 2017, Labour councillor Chika Amadi was suspended from the Labour Party due to comments she made on Twitter that compared homosexuals at Pride marches to 'paedophiles’.

References

Harrow
2014